Odilon Polleunis (born 1 May 1943), nicknamed Lon, is a Belgian football player who won the Belgian Golden Shoe in 1968 while at Sint-Truiden.  He played 22 matches and scored 10 goals for the national team between 1968 and 1975, starting in a 1–2 friendly win against the Netherlands on 7 April 1968.  Polleunis scoring on his debut and the first of his 7 goals in his first 5 Internationals, including a hat-trick against Finland and two against Yugoslavia in World Cup qualifiers in October 1968. 
At the Mexico World Cup in 1970 Polleunis came on as sub in Belgium's win against El Salvador and started against Mexico in the third game replacing Raoul Lambert. In the mid-1970s, "Lon" moved to RWDM.

Honours

Player 
RWD Molenbeek

 Belgian First Division: 1974–75
 Jules Pappaert Cup: 1975
 Amsterdam Tournament: 1975

International 
 UEFA Euro 1972: Third place

Individual 

 Belgian Golden Shoe: 1968
 Man of the Season (Belgian First Division): 1971–72

References

External links

1943 births
Living people
People from Sint-Truiden
Belgian footballers
Belgium international footballers
Belgian Pro League players
Sint-Truidense V.V. players
R.W.D. Molenbeek players
1970 FIFA World Cup players
UEFA Euro 1972 players
Association football forwards
K.S.K. Tongeren players
Footballers from Limburg (Belgium)